The Thailand men's national junior ice hockey team is the  men's national under-20 ice hockey team of Thailand. The team is controlled by the Ice Hockey Association of Thailand, a member of the International Ice Hockey Federation. The team made its international debut in December 2018 at the 2019 IIHF U20 Challenge Cup of Asia Division I tournament which it went on to win.

History
The Thailand men's national junior ice hockey team debuted at the 2019 IIHF U20 Challenge Cup of Asia Division I tournament in Kuala Lumpur, Malaysia. Their opening game of the tournament was against Mongolia which they won 14–1. Thailand went on to win their other two games against Indonesia and Kuwait, finishing first in the standings and winning the tournament. Their 25–0 win against Kuwait is currently their biggest win in international competition. Nathaphat Luckanatinakorn was named best forward after leading the scoring with 14 points and captain Phandaj Khuhakaew was named most valuable player of the tournament. Chayutapon Kulrat was named best defenceman and Chanokchon Limpinphet was selected as the best Thai player of the tournament.

International competitions
2019 IIHF U20 Challenge Cup of Asia. Finish: 5th place (1st in Division I)
2022 IIHF U20 Asia and Oceania Championship. Finish:  1st place

Players and personnel

Roster
From the team's most recent tournament

Team staff
From the team's most recent tournament
Head coach: Juhani Ijas
Assistant coach: Ken Edvin Kindborn
General manager: Pongsaya Hongswadhi
Team leader: M. L. Krisada Kasemsunt
Equipment manager: Sudjai Sornjai
Team staff: Sakchai Chinanuvatana

References

External links
Ice Hockey Association of Thailand

Ice hockey in Thailand
Junior national ice hockey teams
National ice hockey teams in Asia
Ice hockey